The River Bain is a river in Lincolnshire, England, and a tributary of the River Witham.

The Bain rises in the Lincolnshire Wolds at Ludford, a village on The Viking Way long-distance footpath, and flows through or past the villages of Burgh on Bain, Biscathorpe, Donington on Bain, Goulceby, Asterby and Hemingby before reaching the town of Horncastle where it is joined by the River Waring, which rises at Belchford,  to the north east of Horncastle.

After leaving Horncastle, the Bain flows through the villages of Kirkby on Bain, Coningsby and Tattershall, and joins the Witham at Dogdyke. In the late eighteenth and early nineteenth centuries, and after protracted negotiation, a group of venture capitalists led by Sir Joseph Banks canalized the Bain between Horncastle and the Witham. The Horncastle Canal opened in 1802 and was an important goods route before the coming of the railway. It is no longer navigable, but is used extensively by anglers, canoeists, and naturalists.

The river contains significant populations of chub (Leuciscus cephalus), bream, roach and rudd, as well as brown trout, pike, eel, and smaller species such as miller's thumb (Cottus gobio), gudgeon and stone loach (Nœmacheilus barbatus). It is also home to the threatened species of crayfish Austropotamobius pallipes, though there are also populations of the introduced American signal crayfish (Pasifastacus leniusculus), which competes with the native species for food.

The Bain valley was formed by a glacier in the most recent ice-age and, although small, is very obvious. The River Bain is very susceptible to flooding and many floods have occurred during its history, about once every 30–50 years, the most recent being the 2007 United Kingdom floods, when the river overtopped its banks all along its course. Horncastle was particularly badly hit.

Settlements in the valley include Tattershall, Coningsby, Kirkby on Bain, Haltham, Roughton, Horncastle, Hemingby, Goulceby with Asterby, Donington on Bain, Burgh on Bain and Ludford.

Crossings of the River Bain/Horncastle Canal 
This list is incomplete.

This list is incomplete.

References

Bain